High Point State Park is a state park straddling the border of Wantage Township and Montague Township in Sussex County, within the Skylands Region of northwestern New Jersey, United States, near the border with New York State and Pennsylvania. Part of the Kittatinny Mountains, the highest point in the state of New Jersey, the aptly named High Point, sits in the northern reaches of the park, at elevation . Route 23 skirts the park and provides access for visitors from the New Jersey suburbs and from points in New York. The park is administered by the New Jersey Division of Parks and Forestry.

Entrance fees are only charged from Memorial Day weekend to Labor Day: $5.00 on weekdays and $10.00 on weekends.

High Point Monument, built at the summit, offers views of farmland and forest, hills and valleys in three states, out to the Delaware Water Gap National Recreation Area, where the Delaware River separates the ridges of New Jersey from those of Pennsylvania. High Point offers trails for hiking and cross-country skiing and areas for camping and fishing.

The land for High Point State Park, donated by Colonel Anthony R. and Susie Dryden Kuser, was dedicated as a park in 1923. The pleasant landscaping was designed by the Olmsted Brothers of Boston, a prominent landscape architectural firm of that time. The brothers were the sons of Frederick Law Olmsted, who designed Central Park.

To the south, the Appalachian Trail follows a rocky ridge which has views of the valleys and mountains surrounding the area. To the north, the trail drops off the ridge through hemlock gorges into former agricultural fields with a view of the surrounding countryside and the High Point Monument in the distance.

High Point Monument 

The monument was built to honor war veterans, through the generosity of the Kusers. Construction began in 1928 and completed in 1930. At the top of the  structure (the base is ), observers have views of the ridges of the Pocono Mountains toward the west, the Catskill Mountains to the north and the Wallkill River Valley in the southeast.  At the top of New Jersey's tallest knob, the Monument is an obelisk monument similar to other war monuments, such as the one located on Breed's Hill in Massachusetts.

References

External links 
New Jersey Division of Parks and Forestry - High Point State Park
New Jersey Northwest Skylands guide to High Point State Park
Outdoor Places visitor's guide

State parks of New Jersey
State parks of the Appalachians
Parks in Sussex County, New Jersey